Henrik Selberg (17 February 1906 – 3 September 1993) was a Norwegian mathematician. He was born in Bergen as the son of Ole Michael Ludvigsen Selberg and Anna Kristina Brigtsdatter Skeie. He was a brother of Sigmund, Arne and Atle Selberg. He was appointed professor at the University of Oslo from 1962 to 1973. He is best known for his works on complex functions and potential theory.

References

1906 births
1993 deaths
Scientists from Bergen
20th-century Norwegian mathematicians
Academic staff of the University of Oslo
Members of Nasjonal Samling